The Centaure was the name ship of the Centaure class of 74-gun ship of the line of the French Navy.

She was surrendered to the Anglo-Spanish forces at Toulon on 29 August 1793. When Toulon was evacuated by the Allies, the British burnt this ship (among others) on 18 December 1793. The remains were refloated in 1805 and taken to pieces in the following year.

References

Demerliac, Cmdt. Alain, Nomenclature des navires français de 1774 a 1792.  Editions ANCRE, Nice.
Winfield, Rif and Roberts, Stephen (2015) French Warships in the Age of Sail 1786-1861: Design, Construction, Careers and Fates. Seaforth Publishing. .

Ships of the line of the French Navy
Centaure-class ships of the line
1782 ships
Ships built in France
Maritime incidents in 1793